Labourdonnaisia calophylloides is a species of plant in the family Sapotaceae native to the islands of Mauritius and Réunion in the Indian Ocean.

Description

It reaches heights of 20 meters in the wild, and it develops a very characteristic and ornamental shape, as its leaves bunch together at the very tips of each twig.

Distribution
It was formerly widespread across the Mascarene islands. 
In the wild it still occurs in Mauritius at Grand Bassin, Petrin, and is locally common in the recovering forests of Monvert.

Related and similar species
It is not to be confused with its relative, the similarly named Labourdonnaisia glauca. Labourdonnaisia tree species can also sometimes be confused with the endemic trees of the genus Sideroxylon (S.puberulum and S.cinereum). However Labourdonnaisia species have parallel venation on their leaves, while the Sideroxylon species have densely netted leaf-venation and strong midribs under their leaves.

References

Sapotoideae
Flora of Mauritius
Flora of Réunion
Plants described in 1841
Taxa named by Wenceslas Bojer